Heikki Saari (alias "Mörkö", "kermis" or "kmn") (born on 8 September 1984 and originating from Veteli, Finland) is the current drummer for Whorion and Finntroll. He is also the live drummer for Tuoni and former drummer of Norther and Amberian Dawn. He started playing drums around 1987 and influences include Scarve, Opeth, Soilwork, Ensiferum, Disarmonia Mundi, Dream Theater, Meshuggah, Annihilator, Deathchain, Hate Eternal, Rotten Sound, Rytmihäiriö, Sevendust, and Wintersun.

Discography

with Whorion
Fall of Atlas
The Reign Of The Seventh Sector

with Norther
Frozen Angel  (single for the movie Vares 2: Jäätynyt Enkeli)
No Way Back EP
N

with Finntroll 
Vredesvävd

with Virtuocity
(Played under the pseudonym Joey Edith)
Northern Twilight Symphony

with Atheme One

Atheme One has recorded a four-song promotional EP and two songs, titled "Dreamchaser" and "World of Insanity", are available for download. Currently band is not working anymore under this title, but under name of Amberian Dawn with a different drummer as Heikki left the band at the end of 2006.

Session Work
Heikki was recruited by Scottish metal band Hellbound, along with Aleksi Sihvonen from Norther, on their debut EP.

Since 2017, he has been the live session drummer for Wintersun.

External links
Whorion website
Heikki's Youtube channel
Official Norther website
Official Norther MySpace -profile
EndlessWar, an extensive fansite
Official Amberian Dawn website
 NORTHER - the Finnish Breeze fansite
Russian Norther Fansite
Official hellhole of Heikki Saari

References / Notes
All of the information in this article was compiled from information on the Official Norther website, the Official Norther Forum, and the EndlessWar member information page. Photo found at Spinefarm Records press area.

1984 births
People from Hyvinkää
Living people
Finnish heavy metal drummers
Amberian Dawn members
21st-century drummers
Norther members
Finntroll members